Acianthera brunnescens is a species of orchid plant native to Costa Rica.

References 

brunnescens
Flora of Costa Rica